Ashima Shiraishi (白石阿島, Shiraishi Ashima, born April 3, 2001) is an American rock climber. Shiraishi started climbing at the age of six at Rat Rock in Central Park, joining her father. Only a few years later, she quickly established herself as one of the top boulderers and sport climbers in the world. Her numerous accolades include first-place finishes in international competitions, and multiple first female and youngest ascents. Shiraishi is featured in several short documentary-style films, and is the subject of the documentary short "Return to the Red" (2012).

The New York Times referred to her as a "bouldering phenom".  Outside Magazine described her as a "young crusher". And The New Yorker called her "a Gretzky of the granite". At age 13 she became the second-ever female, and youngest person, to climb a sport route with a difficulty grade of 5.14d/5.15a (9a/9a+). In 2016, she made the second ascent of Horizon in Mount Hiei, Japan and became the first-ever female to solve a  boulder.

Biography 
Shiraishi was born in New York City on April 3, 2001. She is the only child of Tsuya and Hisatoshi Shiraishi, who immigrated from Japan in 1978 to New York City. Her father, Hisatoshi "Poppo" Shiraishi, was trained as a dancer in Butoh. When she was 6 years old, her parents took her to Central Park, where she started climbing at Rat Rock. She later climbed at Brooklyn Boulders in Gowanus, Brooklyn.

Shiraishi began climbing competitively at age 7, in 2008, and paired with coach Obe Carrion, an accomplished climber. Their partnership ended in 2012, largely due to tensions and disagreements between Carrion and Shiraishi's father, who has coached her since.
 
At age 8, Shiraishi climbed the classic boulder problem Power of Silence (V10), in Hueco Tanks, Texas. At age 9, she climbed Chablanke (V11/12) and Roger in the Shower (V11) in Hueco Tanks, and several other difficult boulders. At age 10, she climbed Fred Nicole's notorious Crown of Aragorn (V13) also in Hueco Tanks. She is the youngest person ever to climb this grade, and one of very few female climbers to climb a confirmed V13.

Shiraishi also excelled in lead climbing. At age 11, in October 2012, she climbed Southern Smoke at the Red River Gorge, a grade 5.14c (8c+) sport route, becoming the youngest person to climb a route of this difficulty.

In 2013, Shiraishi continued to excel at both bouldering and lead climbing, adding to her ticklist a 5.14a (Slow Food at Céüse) two more V13s (One Summer in Paradise and Automator) and finally two 5.14c's (24 Karats and 50 Words for Pump). In July 2014, she climbed what might be her first V14, Golden Shadow; however, there is a suggestion that Golden Shadow is V13 or V13/V14. She was the second officially recorded female climber (after Tomoko Ogawa) to successfully climb a V14 problem. On the first day of 2015, she climbed her second V14 (V13/V14), The Swarm, claiming the first female top-out of the problem.

At age 13, Shiraishi climbed her first 5.14d (9a), Open Your Mind Direct R1 in Santa Linya. The route was thought to be harder while Shiraishi was attempting it, for a few months earlier a hold had broken off near the top. However, on Christmas Day of 2015, Edu Márin Garcia climbed the route past Shiraishi's end point to the second top and confirmed Shiraishi's route as a 5.14d (9a).
In the same climbing trip, Shiraishi climbed Ciudad de Dios, making her the youngest athlete to climb a 5.14d/5.15a (9a/9a+) and the second female climber to climb at this level. The route has been climbed by 6 other athletes, but there is still no definite consensus on whether the grade is 5.14d or 5.15a.

In 2015, 2016, and 2017 Shiraishi won the IFSC World Youth Championships for both Lead and Bouldering in the Female Youth B category. In March 2016, at 14 years old, she climbed the boulder problem Horizon (8C/V15) in Mount Hiei, Japan. She is the second person ever to finish this problem. With this achievement she became the first female climber as well as the youngest climber to climb this bouldering grade. A few months later, she climbed Sleepy Rave, another V15 (or V14 according to some), in Grampians National Park, Australia. 

In 2017, she was the winner of the female sport category at the USA Climbing Sport & Speed Open National Championships (SCS nationals) held in Denver, Colorado, and placed second at the USA Climbing Bouldering Nationals (ABS nationals) to 10-time champion Alex Puccio. In the same year, she started competing in the Climbing World Cup as an adult.

She is sponsored by Evolv, Arc’teryx, Clif Bar, Petzl, Coca-Cola Japan, All Nippon Airways and Nikon.

In 2021 she announced plans to enroll at UCLA.

Rankings

Climbing World Championships 
Youth

USA Open Championships

Notable ascents

Boulder problems 
:
 Horizon - Mount Hiei (JPN) - 2015
 Sleepy Rave - Grampians National Park (AUS) - 2016

:
 Jade - Rocky Mountain National Park  (USA) - 2021.
 Phenomena - Hinokage  (JPN) - 2015
 Nuclear War - New York City (USA) - 2015
 Golden Shadow - Rocklands (South Africa) - 2014

:
 Wheel of Chaos - Rocky Mountain National Park (USA) - 2021
 Mana - Grampians National Park (AUS) - 2016
 Terre de Sienne - Hueco Tanks  (USA) - 2015
 The Swarm - Bishop (USA) - 2015 - Some say this may be 8B/+(V13/14).
 Blood Meridian - Bishop (USA) - 2014
 Beta Move - Rocklands (South Africa) - 2014
 The Automator - Rocky Mountain National Park (USA) - 2013
 One Summer in Paradise - Magic Wood - 2013
 Fragile Steps - Rocklands (South Africa) - 2012
 Steady Plums Direct - Topside (ZAF) - 2012
 Crown of Aragorn - Hueco Tanks (USA) - 2012 - Youngest person to climb the 8B (V13) difficulty.

Other Bouldering Achievements:
 The Shining - 
 Lethal Design -  - flash
 Chablanke - V11/V12 (8a/8a+)
 Ashimandala - 
 Roger in the Shower - 
 Power of Silence -

Redpointed routes 
9a or 9a+ (5.14d or 5.15a):
 Ciudad de Dios - Santa Linya (ESP) - March 23, 2015 - First female ascent. The route has been repeated by several others, but they have not reached consensus about its grade

:
 Open Your Mind Direct R1 - Santa Linya (ESP) - March 17, 2015 - First female ascent. The route was initially graded , but later a hold broke off leading to speculation that the route might have become harder, possibly 9a+. Shiraishi was the first climber who climbed it after the hold had broken. However, in December 2015 Edu Márin Garcia climbed the route past Shiraishi's end point to a higher top and confirmed the initial  rating for Shiraishi's route.

:
 Southern Smoke - Red River Gorge (USA) - September 2012
 Lucifer - Red River Gorge (USA) - September 2012
 24 Karats  - Red River Gorge (USA) - October 2013
 50 Words for Pump - Red River Gorge (USA) - October 2013
 La Fabela - Santa Linya (ESP) - March 2014 - First female ascent

:
 Digital system - Santa Linya (ESP) - March 2014
 Rollito Sharma extension - Santa Linya (ESP) - March 2014

See also 
History of rock climbing
List of first ascents (sport climbing)

References

External links 
 
 

2001 births
Living people
Sportspeople from New York City
American sportswomen
American sportspeople of Japanese descent
American rock climbers
Female climbers
21st-century American women
Boulder climbers